Gregg Lake is a lake in Alberta, Canada. It is named after J. J. Gregg, a pioneer citizen.

See also
List of lakes of Alberta

References

Lakes of Alberta